William Stoutenburgh House is a historic home located at Hyde Park in Dutchess County, New York.  It was built about 1765 and is a one-story, rectangular dwelling five bays in length and two bays in width.  It is constructed of fieldstone.  The main entrance is sheltered by a one bay, flat roofed wood porch.

It was added to the National Register of Historic Places in 1972.

References

Houses on the National Register of Historic Places in New York (state)
Houses completed in 1765
Houses in Hyde Park, New York
National Register of Historic Places in Dutchess County, New York